Dapingfangornis was an enantiornithine bird. It lived during the Early Cretaceous and is known from fossils—including a complete skeleton—found in the Jiufotang Formation in Liaoning province, People's Republic of China.  Small to medium-sized, it had a sternum with both long and short lateral processes, and a unique thorn-like process on its nares.

References

Bird genera
Early Cretaceous birds of Asia
Enantiornitheans
Fossil taxa described in 2006